Sphenomorphus tersus, the Nakhon Si-Thammarat forest skink or Thai forest skink,  is a species of skink found in Thailand and Malaysia.

References

tersus
Taxa named by Malcolm Arthur Smith
Reptiles described in 1916
Reptiles of Thailand